Drepanostoma is a genus of gastropods belonging to the family Helicodontidae.

The species of this genus are found in Central Europe, Italy.

Species:

Drepanostoma helenae 
Drepanostoma nautiliforme

References

Helicodontidae